This page includes a list of cardinals with large cardinal properties. It is arranged roughly in order of the consistency strength of the axiom asserting the existence of cardinals with the given property. Existence of a cardinal number κ of a given type implies the existence of cardinals of most of the types listed above that type, and for most listed cardinal descriptions φ of lesser consistency strength, Vκ satisfies "there is an unbounded class of cardinals satisfying φ".

The following table usually arranges cardinals in order of consistency strength, with size of the cardinal used as a tiebreaker. In a few cases (such as strongly compact cardinals) the exact consistency strength is not known and the table uses the current best guess.

 "Small" cardinals: 0, 1, 2, ..., ,..., ... (see Aleph number)
 worldly cardinals
 weakly and strongly inaccessible, α-inaccessible, and hyper inaccessible cardinals
 weakly and strongly Mahlo, α-Mahlo, and hyper Mahlo cardinals.
 reflecting cardinals
 weakly compact (= Π-indescribable), Π-indescribable, totally indescribable cardinals
 λ-unfoldable, unfoldable cardinals, ν-indescribable cardinals and λ-shrewd, shrewd cardinals (not clear how these relate to each other).
 ethereal cardinals, subtle cardinals
 almost ineffable, ineffable, n-ineffable, totally ineffable cardinals
 remarkable cardinals
 α-Erdős cardinals (for countable α), 0# (not a cardinal), γ-iterable, γ-Erdős cardinals (for uncountable γ)
 almost Ramsey, Jónsson, Rowbottom, Ramsey, ineffably Ramsey, completely Ramsey, strongly Ramsey, super Ramsey cardinals
 measurable cardinals,  0†
 λ-strong,  strong cardinals, tall cardinals
 Woodin, weakly hyper-Woodin, Shelah, hyper-Woodin cardinals
 superstrong cardinals (=1-superstrong; for n-superstrong for n≥2 see further down.)
 subcompact, strongly compact (Woodin< strongly compact≤supercompact), supercompact, hypercompact cardinals
 η-extendible, extendible cardinals
 Vopěnka cardinals, Shelah for supercompactness, high jump cardinals
 n-superstrong (n≥2), n-almost huge, n-super almost huge, n-huge, n-superhuge cardinals  (1-huge=huge, etc.)
 Wholeness axiom, rank-into-rank (Axioms I3, I2, I1, and I0)
The following even stronger large cardinal properties are not consistent with the axiom of choice, but their existence has not yet been refuted in ZF alone (that is, without use of the axiom of choice). 
Reinhardt cardinal, Berkeley cardinal

References

External links
Cantor's attic
some diagrams of large cardinal properties

Large cardinals

cs:Velké kardinály